The Rainbow Fraternity was a United States-based fraternity founded in the antebellum south that merged with Delta Tau Delta in 1886.

History

Founding and early years
The Rainbow Fraternity was founded at the University of Mississippi in 1848 or 1849 by seven students who had recently transferred from La Grange College (a now defunct college often said to have been in Tennessee, but in fact located in Alabama overlooking the Tennessee Valley). The seven founders were: John Bayliss Earle, John Bannister Herring, James Hamilton Mason, Robert Muldrow, Joshua Long Halbert, Marlborough Pegues, and Drew William Bynum. 

Officially, the founders called their organization the Mystic Sons of Iris. In Greek mythology, Iris was the personification and deity of the rainbow, and the group's founders went to great lengths to incorporate symbolism connected to the rainbow of Iris into the fraternity's emblems and constitution. The original constitution, for example, was divided and subdivided into sections of seven (for the seven colors of the rainbow). There were seven officers for the chapter, each of which wore the fraternity's emblem enameled with one of the rainbow's colors. The ritual of initiation, too, contained seven portions, or degrees. Due to these associations, the Mystic Sons of Iris quickly came to be called simply the "Rainbow Fraternity" or the "W.W.W. Society." 

Its second chapter came in the form of a colony at La Grange College.

The fraternity initially would only accept seven members at any one time, a tribute to the number of its founders, and no man from a northern state could be initiated. The low membership count that resulted led Rainbow to dormancy during the American Civil War. It was revived at the University of Mississippi, after the close of hostilities, spreading to several other schools in the south, and no longer confined by a membership cap.

Merger with Delta Tau Delta
On December 16, 1884, representatives from Rainbow and Delta Tau Delta met in Nashville, Tennessee to finalize the terms of a merger of the two fraternities, the idea of consolidation having been informally discussed for the preceding two years. At the time, Delta Tau Delta president W.W. Cook explained the purpose of the merger was "to get a standing in good universities of the South, and the Rainbows had a corresponding design toward Northern colleges."

The Rainbow chapter at Southwestern University initially expressed optimism about the merger with Delta Tau Delta. As the terms of the compact became clearer, however, members began to have doubts. Rainbows at the University of Texas contacted their Southwestern fraters and suggested both houses surrender their charters and defect to Phi Delta Theta, which had indicated it would be receptive to absorbing the displaced Rainbow members. In doing so, the Southwestern chapter became a new chapter of Phi Delta Theta, while the members of the Texas chapter were simply initiated into the existing Phi Delta Theta chapter on that campus.  

Three other Rainbow chapters, at the University of Tennessee, at Emory and Henry College, and at Chamberlain-Hunt Academy (a preparatory school) were unwanted by Delta Tau Delta and the Rainbow Fraternity withdrew the charters from those chapters so they would not be included in the consolidation (many of the Emory and Henry Rainbows joined the local chapter of Sigma Alpha Epsilon). In the end, the Delta Tau Delta-Rainbow merger resulted in the larger fraternity only acquiring the Rainbow chapters at the University of Mississippi and Vanderbilt University, a process that became official in early 1886. At least one observer at the time questioned whether the Rainbow Fraternity had, in fact, merged with Delta Tau Delta or it was rather the case that two of its chapters had simply bolted Rainbow for the Delts. The heart of the question is whether the charters of Tennessee, Emory and Henry, and Chamberlain-Hunt had been legitimately revoked. The secret nature of the Rainbow constitution makes a more thorough assessment impossible.

During its existence, Rainbow had also chartered chapters at Wofford College, Furman University, Erskine College, Southern Presbyterian University, and Neophogen College, as well as the previously mentioned La Grange chapter. All of these were inactive by the time the merger with Delta Tau Delta occurred.

Revival
In 1889 the Rainbow Fraternity was briefly revived at Wofford College by an alumnus who hadn't received the news that the fraternity had merged with Delta Tau Delta. It subsequently disbanded on learning the fate of its parent organization.

Legacy

Under the terms of its merger with Delta Tau Delta, several elements of the Rainbow Fraternity were preserved.
 Rainbow's official publication The Rainbow, became the official publication of Delta Tau Delta, replacing the latter fraternity's magazine The Crescent. 
 A Rainbow ritual, the Rite of Iris, was preserved and incorporated into Delta Tau Delta work, becoming the combined fraternity's pre-initiation ceremony.
 One of Rainbow's official colors, white, was added to those of Delta Tau Delta so that the combined fraternity's official colors were purple, gold, and white.
 The new "southern division" of Delta Tau Delta was named "the Rainbow division."

References

1849 establishments in Mississippi
Collegiate secret societies
Student societies in the United States
Student organizations established in 1849
Defunct fraternities and sororities